Mihălăşeni may refer to:

Mihălășeni, Botoșani, a commune in Botoşani County, Romania
Mihălăşeni, Ocniţa, a commune in Ocniţa district, Moldova

See also 
 Mihai (name)
 Mihalache (surname)
 Mihăești (disambiguation)
 Mihăiești (disambiguation)
 Mihăileni (disambiguation)
 Mihăilești